This is a list of players who left the National Football League to join the military in a time of war, including those who were drafted, and died in wars. Fourteen died in World War II, two in the Vietnam War and one in the War in Afghanistan. In World War II, Jack Lummus and Charlie Behan were posthumously awarded the Medal of Honor and the Navy Cross, respectively. All player listed below served for the US

World War II

Vietnam War

War in Afghanistan

See also
 List of American football players who died during their careers

References

Died in wars
National Football League
National Football League